John Burrows (1913–1987) was an American baseball player.

John Burrows may also refer to:

 John Burrows (law professor) CNZM, KC, New Zealand Queen's Counsel who chaired the Flag Consideration Panel in 2015–16
 Sir John Cordy Burrows (1813–1876), British surgeon and local politician
 John P. Burrows (born 1954), Professor of the Physics of the Ocean and Atmosphere and Director of the Institutes of Environmental Physics and Remote Sensing at the University of Bremen
 John Burrows (politician) (1864–1925), journalist and member of the Queensland Legislative Assembly
 John Selby (cricketer) (1849–1894), born John Burrows, English cricket player

See also
 John Burroughs (1837–1921), American naturalist and nature essayist
 Sir John Burroughs, 17th-century English soldier and military commander